Khalid Abdulrahman  (born April 22, 1965) is a Saudi singer, actor, musician, poet, and songwriter. He first published poetry under the pseudonym 'Night Companion' before revealing his true identity. Though Khalid did not want to be famous for his singing as he wanted to be for his poetry and retired for a month, but peers and fellow artists urged him to take up singing again.

He started singing in 1981. Some of his top songs are "Ahat" (Arabic: اهات), "Sarihini" (Arabic: صارحيني), "Sudiqini" (Arabic: صدقيني), "Khuberooh" (Arabic: خبروه), "Tedhkar" (Arabic :تذكار), and "Al-ata" (Arabic: العطا) and a lot more. He released an album Rouh Rouhey (Soul of my Soul) in 2008. It contains 8 songs. He continued his career with works such as Khalideat (Arabic: خالديات) in 2010, Thani (Arabic: ثاني) in 2013, La Yrooh Balk (Arabic: لا يروح بالك) in 2014, and Al Hob Alkabeer (Arabic: الحب الكبير) in 2016. His latest song is (تنتخي بي).

References

External links 
 
 

1965 births
Living people
21st-century Saudi Arabian male singers
20th-century Saudi Arabian male singers
Saudi Arabian male film actors
Saudi Arabian male television actors